Jaap Sjouwerman (27 May 1891 – 21 February 1964) was a Dutch wrestler. He competed at the 1920 and the 1924 Summer Olympics.

References

External links
 

1891 births
1964 deaths
Olympic wrestlers of the Netherlands
Wrestlers at the 1920 Summer Olympics
Wrestlers at the 1924 Summer Olympics
Dutch male sport wrestlers
Sportspeople from Amsterdam